Beaumont-cum-Moze is a civil parish in the Tendring district of Essex, England.  According to the 2001 census it had a population of 352, reducing to 339 at the 2011 Census.  The parish includes the hamlets of Beaumont and Moze Cross.

The place-name 'Beaumont' was originally Fulanpettæ in a Saxon charter of circa 995, and Fulepet in the Domesday Book of 1086, meaning 'foul pit'. By 1175-80 it had become Bealmont, meaning 'beautiful hill', a very early example of successful rebranding.

The place-name 'Moze' is first attested in the Domesday Book, where it appears as Mosa. This is from the Old English mos meaning 'marsh' or 'moss'.

Julian Byng, 1st Viscount Byng of Vimy lived at Thorpe Hall in Thorpe-le-Soken and is buried at the 11th-century Parish Church of St Leonard in Beaumont-cum-Moze.

Beaumont Cut is a derelict canal in the parish.

Governance
Beaumont-cum-Moze is part of the electoral ward called Beaumont and Thorpe. The population of this ward at the 2011 Census was 2,300.

References

Civil parishes in Essex
Tendring

External links
 St Leonard & St Mary's Church website